The 1956 Ohio State Buckeyes football team was an American football team that represented the Ohio State University in the 1956 Big Ten Conference football season. In their sixth season under head coach Woody Hayes, the Buckeyes compiled a 6–3 record.

The team's statistical leaders included Don Clark with 88 passing yards, Clark with 797 rushing yards, Clark with 885 yards of total offense (second best in the Big Ten), and Leo Brown with 151 receiving yards.

Schedule

Roster
HB Dick LeBeau, So.

Preseason
In the final AP Poll of the 1955 season, Ohio State was ranked No. 5. In the 1956 pre-season AP Poll, Ohio State remained ranked No. 5.

In the spring of 1956, the Big Ten conducted an investigation into allegations that Ohio State coach Woody Hayes had provided financial assistance to players in violation of conference rule. Hayes admitted that he had loaned money to players but refused to provide an accounting of the loans.  The investigation also discovered a "serious irregularity" in Ohio State's off-campus work program. In April 1956, the conference placed Ohio State on probation for one year and declared the football team ineligible to play in the 1957 Rose Bowl.

Game summaries
On September 29, 1956, Ohio State (ranked No. 8 in the AP Poll) defeated Nebraska, 34–7, before a crowd of 82,153 at Ohio Stadium in Columbus, Ohio. The crowd was the largest for an opening game in Ohio State history to that point. The Buckeyes rushed for 416 yards in the game. Ohio halfback Don Clark scored two touchdowns on runs of 35 and 38 yards.

On October 6, Ohio State (ranked No. 4 in the AP Poll) defeated Stanford, 32–20. The crowd of 82,881 was the largest to that point to see a game at Ohio Stadium. Stanford quarterback John Brodie completed 21 of 35 passes for 256 yards and two touchdowns. Ohio State gained 302 of its 320 yards on the ground. In the fourth quarter, Don Clark ran for a touchdown and threw an 18-yard touchdown pass to Jim Roseboro to break a 20–20 tie.

On October 13, Ohio State (ranked No. 5 at the AP Poll) defeated Illinois, 26–6, before a crowd of 58,247 at Memorial Stadium in Champaign. Ohio State rushed for 307 yards, aided by the blocking of guard Jim Parker who was selected as the team's most valuable player for the 1956 season. Parker also played on defense and recovered a fumble at the Illinois 10-yard line to set up a touchdown. Quarterback Frank Ellwood rushed for two touchdowns and threw a touchdown pass to Jim Roseboro.

On October 20, Ohio State (ranked No. 5 in the AP Poll) lost to Penn State, 7–6, before a crowd of 82,584 at Ohio Stadium in Columbus. Neither team scored through the first three quarters. Penn State's Bruce Gilmore scored on a short run in the fourth quarter, and Milt Plum kicked the extra point. Later in the quarter, Don Clark scored for Ohio State on a short touchdown run, but Frank Kremblas' kick for extra point went wide of the goalpost.

On October 27, Ohio State defeated Wisconsin, 21–0, before a crowd of 82,661 at Ohio Stadium in Columbus. The victory was Ohio State's 16th in a row against a Big Ten opponent, tying a conference opponent.

On November 3, Ohio State (ranked No. 6 in the AP Poll) defeated Northwestern, 6–2, before a homecoming crowd of 42,000 at Dyche Stadium in Evanston. Northwestern guard Al Viola blocked a punt in the first quarter that rolled out of the end zone for a safety. With 16 seconds left in the first half, Ellwood threw a seven-yard touchdown pass to Leo Brown.

On November 10, Ohio State (ranked No. 7 in the AP Poll) defeated Indiana, 35–14, before a crowd of 82,073 at Ohio Stadium in Columbus. The victory was Ohio State's 17th in a row against conference opponents, setting a new conference record. The Buckeyes also broke the Big Ten single-game record with 465 rushing yards against the Hoosiers.

On November 17, Iowa (ranked No. 7 in the AP Poll) defeated Ohio State (ranked No. 6), 6–0, before a crowd of 57,732 at Iowa Stadium. Ohio State went into the game with the second best rushing attack in the country but were held to 147 rushing yards, their lowest rushing yardage total in two years. The result broke Ohio State's winning streak of 17 games against conference opponents and clinched for Iowa the conference championship and a berth in the Rose Bowl.  After time expired, Iowa fans hauled down the goal posts and paraded through Iowa City.

On November 24, in the annual Michigan–Ohio State football rivalry game, Michigan (ranked No. 9 in the AP Poll) defeated Ohio State (ranked No. 12), 19–0, before a crowd of 82,223 at Ohio Stadium. The loss deprived Ohio State of a share of its third consecutive Big Ten title and pushed Michigan to second in the conference standing. Terry Barr, playing in his last game for Michigan, scored two touchdowns.

Nebraska

Stanford

Illinois

Penn State

Wisconsin

Northwestern

Indiana

Iowa

Michigan

Rankings and awards
On December 3, 1956, both the Associated Press (AP) and United Press (UP) released their final college football polls. Both organizations ranked undefeated Oklahoma at the No. 1 spot. The AP ranked Ohio State at No. 15, while the UP did not rank Ohio State in its top 20.

Only one Ohio State player, guard Jim Parker, was picked by the Associated Press (AP) and/or the United Press (UP) as a first-team player on the 1956 All-Big Ten Conference football team. Parker received first-team honors from both the AP and UP. Parker was also a consensus first-team pick for the 1956 College Football All-America Team. He also ranked ninth in the 1956 Heisman Trophy voting. Parker was also awarded the Outland Trophy.

1957 NFL Draft

The following Ohio State players were selected in the 1957 NFL Draft:

References

Ohio State
Ohio State Buckeyes football seasons
Ohio State Buckeyes football